The American Cemetery, also known as the Old City Cemetery, is a historic cemetery on Upper Mill Bay Road in Kodiak, Alaska.  It is a small parcel of land near the intersection with Wilson Avenue, about one third of an acre, now completely surrounded by buildings.  It was established in 1868 by the United States Army, not long after occupying the formerly Russian community after the Alaska Purchase, and is the second-oldest cemetery (after the one established by the Russians) in the city.  The cemetery was used by the military and later the community until 1940.  At least seven soldiers, including five from the original occupation of Fort Kodiak, are known to be buried here.

The cemetery was listed on the National Register of Historic Places in 1980.

See also
 National Register of Historic Places listings in Kodiak Island Borough, Alaska

References

External links
 

Buildings and structures completed in 1868
Buildings and structures on the National Register of Historic Places in Kodiak Island Borough, Alaska
Cemeteries on the National Register of Historic Places in Alaska
Kodiak, Alaska
Military cemeteries in the United States
Cemeteries established in the 1860s
1868 establishments in Alaska